Jameson Griffin "Jake" Lacy (born February 14, 1986) is an American actor. He is known for his portrayal of Pete Miller on the ninth and final season of The Office, as Fran Parker in the fourth and fifth seasons of HBO's Girls, and his role as Shane Patton on the HBO series The White Lotus, the latter of which earned him a nomination for the Primetime Emmy Award for Outstanding Supporting Actor in a Limited or Anthology Series or Movie. Other television roles include those in the ABC sitcom Better with You and the Showtime series I'm Dying Up Here. In addition, he played Robert Berchtold in the Peacock miniseries A Friend of the Family.

In film, he has starred in Obvious Child (2014), Carol (2015), How to Be Single (2016), Christmas Inheritance (2017), Rampage (2018), and Being the Ricardos (2021).

Early life
Lacy grew up in Pittsford, Vermont and attended Otter Valley Union High School, graduating in 2004.

In 2008, Lacy graduated from the University of North Carolina School of the Arts (UNCSA) in Winston-Salem. After graduation, he worked odd jobs in the state of New York. He worked as a gym receptionist, a bar-back at a club, and a waiter, while going to auditions during the day, until being cast in the role of Casey in Better with You.

Career
Lacy acted in high school and performed on professional stages in the productions of A Midsummer Night's Dream as Demetrius (in Hartford Stage's production), and Much Ado About Nothing as Conrad (in the Oberon Theater Ensemble's production). Lacy played brief roles in a few episodes of Guiding Light before its cancellation. In 2010, he had a lead role in the Columbia thesis film C'est moi.

From 2010 to 2011, Lacy starred as Casey in the ABC sitcom Better with You. He starred as Pete Miller, or "Plop", in the ninth and last season of The Office. His next role was in the independent sports comedy Balls Out, where he played the lead Caleb Fuller who leads an intramural football team. In 2014, he starred in the comedy-drama film Obvious Child opposite Jenny Slate. He also appeared in the HBO comedy Girls as Fran, a love interest of Lena Dunham's protagonist Hannah. Lacy starred opposite Rooney Mara in Carol (2015), as Richard, her character's boyfriend.

In 2016, Lacy appeared in the WWII-set dramedy Their Finest, directed by Lone Scherfig, which had its world premiere at the Toronto International Film Festival, and Miss Sloane, a political thriller directed by John Madden, which had its world premiere at the AFI Fest. In 2017, Lacy co-starred in I'm Dying Up Here, a comedy series on Showtime.  In 2019, he appeared as a love interest of Gwen Verdon, played by Michelle Williams, in Fosse/Verdon, on FX.

Personal life 
Lacy married long-time girlfriend Lauren Deleo on August 22, 2015, in Dorset, Vermont; they have two sons.

Lacy supported Senator Bernie Sanders for President in the 2016 U.S. presidential election, but also stated that people should not necessarily listen to actors regarding politics.

Filmography

References

External links
 

1985 births
Living people
21st-century American male actors
American male film actors
American male stage actors
American male television actors
Male actors from Vermont
People from Pittsford, Vermont
University of North Carolina School of the Arts alumni